Studentenstadt Freimann is a student housing complex in Munich, Germany.

The complex was built in two stages, between 1961-1968 and between 1970-1977, and is Germany's largest student housing complex with 2,478 residential units in 14 buildings. Next to the Olympic Village, it is the second largest complex of the Studentenwerk München. In order to create affordable housing relatively quickly, several "Wohncontainer" (similar to mobile homes) have been set up near the original buildings. Today, more than 2,500 people live in "StuSta". The streets that run through Studentenstadt are named after the World War II era resistance group, the White Rose. For example, they are named Willi-Graf-Straße, Hans-Leipelt-Straße, and Christoph-Probst-Straße.

Location
Studentenstadt is located in northern Munich (Freimann) between the Autobahn A9 and the northern part of the Englischer Garten in the neighborhood of Schwabing. The nearest U-Bahn stop, Studentenstadt, is served by the U6. A number of bus lines also serve the station (50, 143, 177, 181, 231, and 233).

History
The concept was first developed by Egon Wiberg, the rector of Ludwig-Maximilians-Universität. It was founded by the Studentenwerk München. After the Bavarian Prime Minister, Hanns Siedel, set aside a parcel of land of about 8 hectares on the border of the English Garden for use, a series of hearings and meetings took place between the state of Bavaria and Studentenwerk München. At the beginning of the project, the Max Kade Foundation donated 1,000,000 German marks. There was then an architectural competition in 1960. The resulting winner was Ernst Maria Lang, with the architectural company Lang und Pogadl. After that, about 1,500 living spaces were planned in Studentenstadt, and this count was later raised to 2,500 in 1971. 

Construction began in 1961, and Studentenstadt was built in four stages. In the first stage, between 1961 and 1963, Houses 1-6 were built. In the second, between 1966 and 1968, Houses 7 and 8 were built. In the third, between 1971 and 1973, Houses 9 and 10 were built. Finally, in the final stage, the last four houses were built between 1974 and 1975. A few of these houses are named, mostly after those who supported construction. In 1975, a children's nursery was opened, and the Hans-Scholl-Halle was built between 1976 and 1977. The U-Bahn stop at Studentenstadt was opened on October 19, 1971, just as 8 of the 14 houses were completed.

The Residences
The Studentenstadt has two primary areas:  "Altstadt" (old city), consisting of several 2 to 3 floor buildings plus two 9 floor towers, and "Neustadt" (new city), where students live in 7 - 20 floor towers.

"Altstadt" consists of 627 single-room apartments with a size of 8 - 20 square meters each. Each one contains a sink. Kitchens, showers, and toilets are shared by all. There are also community lounges.

"Neustadt" consists of 1,458 single-room apartments. All apartments have a kitchenette, shower, and toilet. There are also 54 married couples apartments with 35 - 77 square meters of living space. They have two rooms, a kitchen, and a bathroom.

Rugby
There is a rugby union club in the Studentenstadt, the StuSta München.

Soccer
There is a soccer club in the Studentenstadt, that also includes a women's soccer team.

The Manhattan
The Manhattan is a shared facility located in the tallest building in the Studentenstadt. During the summer it is located indoors on the 21st floor. When the weather permits, the Manhattan uses the west terrace on the 19th floor.
It is operated by a group of students who live in the StuSta and subject to the jurisdiction of the "Heimrat" (the city council of the StuSta).

Cultural Life

The highpoint of cultural life at Studentenstadt is the Student Culture Festival, or StuStaCulum, a festival held annually since 1989 in early summer by many theatre groups, bands, and artists. It attracts about 20'000 visitors every year. Another special was the student club 20 1/2, supervised by Robin Wachsmann between 2010-2017. Unfortunately, it was closed due to construction.

Public transportation
Adjacent to Studentenstadt is the Studentenstadt U-Bahn station, which provides access to the U6 line and some Metro bus routes. That station is one of the few stations that are built above ground.

External links

 Studentenstadt Freimann
 Studentenwerk München 
 StuStaCulum 

Education in Munich
Buildings and structures in Munich